Diane M. Lanpher (born November 26, 1955) is an American Democratic politician. She is a member of the Vermont House of Representatives from the Addison's 3rd District, being first elected in 2008.

References

1955 births
Living people
Politicians from Buffalo, New York
Democratic Party members of the Vermont House of Representatives
Women state legislators in Vermont
21st-century American politicians
21st-century American women politicians